Ivo Lill (24 June 1953 – 4 August 2019) was an Estonian glass artist.

Early life and education
Ivo Lill was born in Tallinn to Felix Lill and Asta Lill (née Multer). His father was arrested by Soviet authorities and spent several years sentenced to forced labor in the gulag system in Siberia, but was able to later return to the family. Lill was the youngest child of three siblings; he had two older sisters, Kadri, and actress Mari Lill. Lill grew up and attended schools in the district of Nõmme and spent time visiting his grandmother on the island of Saaremaa. His niece is actress Elisabet Reinsalu.

Lill was a 1985 graduate of the Estonian Academy of Arts in Tallinn and worked almost exclusively in the medium of glass sculpting and design. He was a member of the Estonian Artists' Association, G.A.S. (The Glass Art Society) of Seattle, U.S.A., and the Centro Studio Vetro, of Murano-Venice, Italy.

Works in public collections
 Art Museum of Estonia - Tallinn, Estonia
 Estonian Art Fund - Tallinn, Estonia
 Tallinn Art Hall - Tallinn, Estonia
 Tallinn Museum of Applied Art - Tallinn, Estonia
 Tartu Art Museum - Tartu, Estonia
 Tallinn Business Center - Tallinn, Estonia
 The Corning Museum of Glass - Corning, New York, U.S.A.
 Glasmuseet Ebeltoft - Ebeltoft, Denmark
 Glasmuseum Frauenau - Frauenau, Germany
 Centre del Vidre de Barcelona -  Barcelona, Spain
 Gus-Khrustalny Glass Museum - Gus-Khrustalny, Russia
 Bohemia Hall - Novy Bor, Czech Republic
 Ministry of Culture of the Republic of Lithuania - Vilnius, Lithuania
 Zimmerli Art Museum at Rutgers University - New Brunswick, New Jersey, U.S.A.

Commissioned works
 since 2006 – Estonian Annual Theatre Awards "Theodori silm" trophies
 2002 – Trophies for the Eurovision Song Contest
 since 1999 – Annual Prizes for The Black Nights Film festival
 since 1999 – Annual Prizes for Estonian Drama Theatre
 1994 – Glass sculpture "The Right To Hope", (47×20×20 cm), "One World Art" programme, travelling exhibition
 1993 – Glass sculpture "The Trinity", (28×28×27 cm), a gift to the Catholic Pope John Paul II from the Union of Estonian Churches, Pope's Artistic Collection, Vatican City
 1986 – Glass sculpture “Seven Cubed”, (30×30×30 cm), Ministry of Culture of Russia (Moscow)
 1985 – Glass sculpture “Monster", (100×50×70 cm), Estonian Embassy in Moscow, Russia

Awards
 2014 – Tallinn Order of Merit
 2001 – The Silver Prize of the International Exhibition of Glass, Kanazawa, Japan
 1999 – Kristjan Raud Annual Arts Award 
 1995 - Kristjan Raud Annual Arts Award 
 1988 – The prize on the Baltic Applied Art Triennial IV
 1986 – The Annual Estonian Artists' Union award

Personal life and death
Ivo Lill was married to Irene Lill. The couple had two daughters. He died unexpectedly at age 66 in Haapsalu on 4 August 2019.

References

External links
 Ivo Lill homepage
 Estonian Museum of Applied Art and Design 
 Internet Art Resources
 Gallery Viviann Napp

1953 births
2019 deaths
Glass artists
Artists from Tallinn
Estonian Academy of Arts alumni
20th-century Estonian male artists
21st-century Estonian male artists